Tom Park (born 4 September 1954) is a former Australian rules footballer who played with Essendon in the Victorian Football League (VFL). He later played with Brunswick in the Victorian Football Association (VFA).

Notes

External links 		
		

Essendon Football Club past player profile
		
		
		

Living people
1954 births
Australian rules footballers from Victoria (Australia)		
Essendon Football Club players
Keilor Football Club players
Brunswick Football Club players